The 2014 Split district elections were held on 9 June 2014 for the councils of 34 city districts and local committees of Split. The Croatian Democratic Union coalition won 98 council seats, an absolute majority in 10 districts and a relative majority in 6 districts. The Social Democratic Party of Croatia coalition won 45 seats.

Results

See also
2013 Split local elections

References 

Split district 2014
Split district 
Split district 
Split, Croatia
History of Split, Croatia